N-acetyllactosaminide beta-1,6-N-acetylglucosaminyl-transferase is an enzyme that in humans is encoded by the GCNT2 gene.

This gene encodes the enzyme responsible for formation of the blood group I antigen. The i and I antigens are distinguished by linear and branched poly-N-acetyllactosaminoglycans, respectively. The encoded protein is the I-branching enzyme, a beta-1,6-N-acetylglucosaminyltransferase responsible for the conversion of fetal i antigen to adult I antigen in erythrocytes during embryonic development. Mutations in this gene have been associated with adult i blood group phenotype. Alternatively spliced transcript variants encoding different isoforms have been described.

References

Further reading